Patrycja Piechowiak (born 1 September 1992) is a Polish weightlifter. She competed in the women's 69 kg event at the 2016 Summer Olympics.

References

External links
 

1992 births
Living people
Polish female weightlifters
Olympic weightlifters of Poland
Weightlifters at the 2016 Summer Olympics
People from Grodzisk Wielkopolski
European Weightlifting Championships medalists
21st-century Polish women